Adana İdman Yurdu was a women's association football team based in Adana, Turkey. The club was merged with Adana Demirspor in August 2022 and the women's football department formed the Adana Demirspor's women football department. The team played in the Turkish Women's Football Super League.

History 
The club was founded in 1993 with the women's football department. The team was promoted to the Women's First League following the 2008–09 season in the Women's Second League. In the 2010–11 season, they placed third, their best achievement so far. The team finished the 2015–16 season ranking at 7th place. They were relegated to the Second League after losing the play-out matches in the 2016–17 season.

Adana İdman Yurdu are the only women's football team in Adana.

The team play in the 2021-22 season of the Women's Super League. The team's sport gear is sponsored by the local securities company "Dinamik Menkul Değerler A.Ş." and thus is called Bitexen Adana İdmanyurduspor. The team manager is the former women's footballer Meryem Özyumşak.

Colors 
Adana İdman Yurdu's colors are navy, red and white.

Stadium 
The team play their home matches at the Gençlik Stadium. The venue has a seating capacity of 2,000, and its ground is covered by artificial turf.

Statistics 
.

(1): Season discontinued due to COVID-19 pandemic in Turkey
(2): Finished Group B as leader, lost the first round in the play-offs
(3): Season in progress

Current squad 
.

Head coach:  Necat Bakan

Honours 
 Turkish Women's First League
 Third places (1): 2010–11

Kit history

Squad history

References

Further reading

External links 
Adana İdman Yurdu at Turkish Football Federation 

Women's football clubs in Turkey
Association football clubs established in 1993
1993 establishments in Turkey
Sport in Adana